Holm Olaf Bursum (February 10, 1867August 7, 1953) was a politician from the U.S. state of New Mexico, whose activities were instrumental for gaining statehood under the Taft Administration and later served as United States Senator from New Mexico.

Background
Bursum was born at Fort Dodge, Iowa to Norwegian-American parents. He attended the public schools in Iowa before moving to New Mexico Territory in 1881.  He settled near Socorro and engaged in raising livestock.

Political career
He was a member of the New Mexico Territorial senate, 1899–1900; chairman of the Territorial central committee in 1905 and 1911; member of the State constitutional convention in 1910; and a member of the Republican National Committee, 1920-1924.

Bursum was appointed on March 11, 1921, and subsequently elected on September 20, 1921, as a Republican to the United States Senate to fill the vacancy caused by the resignation of Albert B. Fall and served from March 11, 1921, to March 3, 1925. He was an unsuccessful candidate for reelection in 1924. He served as chairman, Committee on Pensions (Sixty-seventh and Sixty-eighth Congresses).  Subsequently, Holm Bursum pursued a newspaper career in  Washington, D.C. and in New Mexico until his death in 1953.

Later years
Bursum subsequently returned to Socorro and resumed his former business interests until his death in Colorado Springs, Colorado. He is interred in Socorro Protestant Cemetery in Socorro.

Through his sister Ruth Bursum's marriage, he is connected to the Paxton family, a name of equal prominence in New Mexico. Holm Bursum's name can either be spelled Bursum or Bursom.  The name is pronounced Ber-sum.

The Bursum House is listed on the National Register of Historic Places.

In 1965, he was inducted into the Hall of Great Westerners of the National Cowboy & Western Heritage Museum.

References

Other sources
Fernlund, Kevin Jon. Senator Holm O. Bursum and the Mexican Ring, 1921-1924  (New Mexico Historical Review 66. October 1991)
Moorman, Donald Raymond  A Political Biography of Holm O. Bursum: 1899-1924 (Ph.D. dissertation, University of New Mexico, 1962)

External links

The Election Case of Holm O. Bursum v. Sam G. Bratton of New Mexico
Bursum, New Mexico
The Bursum Road

1867 births
1953 deaths
American people of Norwegian descent
Republican Party United States senators from New Mexico
New Mexico Republicans
Politicians from Fort Dodge, Iowa
People from Socorro, New Mexico
Ranchers from New Mexico